Events from the year 1868 in Sweden

Incumbents
 Monarch – Charles XV

Events

 19 September - inauguration of Dalsland Canal. 
 1 November - Folk high school introduced in Sweden.
 Bladin's International School
 United Methodist Church of Sweden

Births
 January 19 - Ebba Atterbom, translator and educator (died 1961)
 February 23 - Anna Hofman-Uddgren, Cabaret singer and movie director (died 1947)
 April 7 - Herman Bernhard Lundborg, physician and a race biologist. (died 1943)
 April 25 - Ernst Linder, arny general who served in the Swedish Army from 1887 to 1918 (died 1943)
 June 29 - Gustaf Nordenskiöld, scholar who was the first to scientifically study the ancient Pueblo ruins in Mesa Verde. (died 1895)
 July 24 - Axel Elof Jäderholm, zoologist and botanist (died 1927)
 September 6 - Axel Hägerström, philosopher (died 1939)
 November 15 - Josef Hammar, military surgeon and adventurer (died 1927)
 October 18 - Ernst Didring, leader of the Swedish Red Cross for prisoners of the war between 1915 and 1920. (died 1931)
 December 12 - Axel Petersson Döderhultarn, one of the recognized masters of wood carving (died 1925)
 December 22 - Gustaf Fjæstad, Swedish painter (died 1948)

Deaths
 3 April - Franz Berwald, composer (born 1796)
 Sofia Ahlbom, artist (born 1803)
 Maria Fredrica von Stedingk, composer (born 1799)

References

 
Years of the 19th century in Sweden
Sweden